The Lindormen class is a class of two minelayers built for the Royal Danish Navy to replace the s that dated from World War II. The Lindormen class was designed to lay controlled controlled minefields in the Baltic Sea during the Cold War as part of NATO's defence plan for the region. They were taken out of service by the Danish in 2004, put up for sale in 2005 and transferred to Estonia in 2006.

Design 
The ships have a steel hull and were originally designed to lay controlled minefields. The ships were initially propelled by two Frichs 7AX diesel engines turning two shafts creating . This gave them a speed of  They were later replaced with two MTU diesel engines, providing  of power in total. The ships were initially armed with two Oerlikon 20 mm cannons - one fore and one aft. In 1985, another 20 mm cannon was added to the fore. In 1997, a pair of FIM-92 Stinger launchers were also added. The weapons were removed when they were sold to Estonia. Estonian Navy later equipped the ships with M2 Browning machine guns. They are also equipped with two I-band navigation radars, two cranes (one 2 tonne crane fore and one 2.8 tonne crane aft) and two boats. The ships have a large mine deck, sufficient for carrying 50–60 naval mines, but can also be used for diving support, training or command duties. Their initial complement was 27 in Danish service which increased to 29 in Estonian service.

Ships in class

Service history

Danish service
Following the Danish entry into NATO, the Royal Danish Navy was tasked with defending the Baltic Sea against the Soviets during the Cold War. To fulfill this objective, the Danish Navy placed an emphasis on the acquisition of torpedo boats, submarines, minelayers and minesweepers. The class consists of two ships, Lindormen and Lossen. The purchase of the cable-minelayers was approved in the 1973 defence bill as a replacement for the World War II-era s for the Royal Danish Navy. The ships were built by Svendborg Skibsværft in 1977. Lindormen served as a command and support ship in NATO's Standing Naval Force Channel (STANVAFORCHAN) in 1989 and again in 1990. Lossen served with STANAVFORCHAN in 1982, 1985, 1988, 1989 and 1992. Lossen was also used as a submarine depot ship.

Estonian service
Both ships were decommissioned by the Danish Navy on 22 October 2004 and sold to Estonia in 2006. Tasuja was first placed in service with the Estonian Navy while Wambola was lent to the Estonian Maritime Academy as a civilian training vessel. Wambola was held in reserve until it replaced Tasuja in Estonian Navy service in 2016. Wambola served with the Standing NATO Mine Countermeasures Group 1in 2017.

Notes

Citations

Sources

External links 
 Estonian Navy
 Standing NATO Mine Countermeasures Group One (SNMCMG1)

 
Mine warfare vessels of the Estonian Navy
Mine warfare vessels of the Royal Danish Navy
Minelayers
Mine warfare vessel classes